Bukoba Rural District is one of the eight districts of the Kagera Region of Tanzania.  It is bordered to the north by Missenyi District, to the east by Lake Victoria and Bukoba Urban District, to the south by Muleba District and to the west by Karagwe District. Its administrative seat is Bukoba town.

According to the 2012 Tanzania National Census, the population of Bukoba Rural District was 289,697, from 394,020 in 2002, and 340,800 in 1988.

Transport
Paved trunk road T4 from Mwanza to the Ugandan border passes through Bukoba Rural District.

Administrative subdivisions
As of 2012, Bukoba Rural District was administratively divided into 29 wards.

Wards

 Buhendangabo
 Bujugo
 Butelankuzi
 Butulage
 Ibwera
 Izimbya
 Kaagya
 Kaibanja
 Kanyangereko
 Karabagaine
 Kasharu
 Katerero
 Katoma
 Katoro
 Kemondo
 Kibirizi
 Kikomero
 Kishanje
 Kishogo
 Kyamulaile
 Maruku
 Mikoni
 Mugajwale
 Nyakato
 Nyakibimbili
 Rubafu
 Rubale
 Ruhunga
 Rukoma

References

Districts of Kagera Region